Daniil Smirnov is a Russian Paralympic swimmer. He represented Russian Paralympic Committee athletes at the 2020 Summer Paralympics.

Career
Smirov started his sport when he was 11. He received the title of master of sport for the Russian federation in 2017. Smirnov represented Russian Paralympic Committee athletes at the 2020 Summer Paralympics and won a gold medal in the men's 4 × 100 metre medley relay 34pts event.

References

Living people
Paralympic swimmers of Russia
Swimmers at the 2020 Summer Paralympics
Medalists at the 2020 Summer Paralympics
Paralympic medalists in swimming
Paralympic gold medalists for the Russian Paralympic Committee athletes
Year of birth missing (living people)
S9-classified Paralympic swimmers
21st-century Russian people